Yagodny is a rural locality (a khutor) in Osichkovskoye Rural Settlement, Rudnyansky District, Volgograd Oblast, Russia. The population was 62 as of 2010.

Geography 
Yagodny is located 27 km northwest of Rudnya (the district's administrative centre) by road. Kozlovka is the nearest rural locality.

References 

Rural localities in Rudnyansky District, Volgograd Oblast